The Flying Squad is a 1940 British crime film directed by Herbert Brenon and starring Sebastian Shaw, Phyllis Brooks and Jack Hawkins. It was based on a 1928 novel by Edgar Wallace in which the officers of the Flying Squad attempt to tackle a  drug-smuggling organisation. In the past, the novel had been filmed in  1929 and 1932.

Cast
 Sebastian Shaw as Inspector Bradley
 Phyllis Brooks as Ann Perryman
 Jack Hawkins as Mark McGill
 Basil Radford as Sederman
 Ludwig Stössel as Li Yoseph
 Manning Whiley as Ronnie Perryman
 Kathleen Harrison as Mrs. Schifan
 Cyril Smith as Tiser
 Henry Oscar as Sir Edward - Police Commissioner
 Kynaston Reeves as Magistrate
 Allan Jeayes as Johnson

Critical reception
TV Guide wrote, "routine stuff, just as unimaginatively done here as it was in the 1932 film of the same name" ; while Blueprintreview wrote, "to be honest, the story isn’t particularly sophisticated, especially not by today’s standards, but it manages to entertain and hold the attention, even if some of the dialogue feels very unreal – I’m sure police and criminals of that time didn’t speak as posh as they do here!"

References

External links
 

1940 films
Films directed by Herbert Brenon
British crime drama films
Films based on British novels
Films based on works by Edgar Wallace
Films set in London
Films shot at Associated British Studios
British black-and-white films
Remakes of British films
1940s police procedural films
British police films
1940s English-language films
1940s British films
Cultural depictions of Metropolitan Police officers